Stormont government can refer to:
 Government of Northern Ireland (1921–1972)
 Northern Ireland Executive, since 1998